Frank Andruski (born July 14, 1943) was a football player in the Canadian Football League for eight years. Andruski played defensive back for the Calgary Stampeders from 1966 to 1973. He was a CFL All-Star in 1967, 1968 and 1971, and was a part of the Stampeders 1971 Grey Cup winning team. He played college football at the University of Utah. He played one season in the WFL with the Portland Storm.

References

1943 births
Living people
American players of Canadian football
Calgary Stampeders players
Canadian football defensive backs
Portland Storm players
Utah Utes football players